Epirhyssa johanna is a parasitoid wasp native to Uganda.

Description 
Adults are ~  in length and are of anoverall orange color, with a white face and black antenna, jaws, middle and back of head, and areas on the back. The ovipositor has a dark, protective outer covering. Wings are translucent, with a faint brownish tinge near the highest point.

Discovery
The species was descreibed in 2019 from malaise trap samples taken on a plantation in Kibale National Park, Uganda.

Habitat and distribution 
The species prefers to live in humid lowland forests and does not like dry periods and arid areas. Its habitat consists of moist evergreen forests, grasslands, woodland thickets, swamp and colonizing shrubs in a medium altitude environment. Specimens were taken in swampy (waterlogged) primary forests, other primary forests with mainly red-clay, and farmlands converted back to forest at middle elevations near the Congo Basin. They are partial to decaying logs.

Ecology 
Epirhyssa johanna is a parasitoid of the larvae of wood-boring sawflies or beetles, hunting them to feed to their larvae.  After mating, the female will place her eggs inside the larvae using her ovipositor. Adult wasps feed on plants, fruits, and nectar.

References 

Endemic fauna of Uganda
Parasitic wasps
Hymenoptera of Africa
Insects of Uganda
Insects described in 2019